State Route 79 (SR 79) is a state highway in the U.S. state of California. The route begins at Interstate 8 (I-8) in San Diego County, continuing north through the town of Cuyamaca into Julian. After passing through Warner Springs, the route crosses into Riverside County, serving the cities of Temecula and Murrieta. SR 79 ends at I-10 in Beaumont.

Route description

The road runs along Old Highway 80 in the town of Descanso, until splitting to the north at a T intersection. The route then traverses Cuyamaca and Cuyamaca Rancho State Park on its way north. This portion of the route is very serpentine, with hairpin turns, as it follows the contours of the land by moving laterally, rather than up-and-down or via cuts.

At Julian, both routes join at a T intersection just south of town, thus requiring a turn to stay on SR 79, and turn at an intersection in the northern portion of downtown. At Santa Ysabel, SR 79 comes to a T intersection with SR 78 running east–west. SR 79 continues northwest, meeting the eastern terminus of SR 76 near Lake Henshaw at the settlement of Morettis and passing through Warner Springs before crossing into Riverside County. SR 79 then meets the western terminus of SR 371 before going through Aguanga. It then passes Vail Lake and parallels Temecula Creek as it approaches the Temecula city limits, where it becomes a city-maintained road}.

It overlaps I-15 for about three miles through Temecula. The ramps connecting SR 79 to I-15 are the first and third ramps northbound (second and fourth southbound) of those located between the Riverside/San Diego county line and the I-15/I-215 junction. In both cases, to enter SR 79 from I-15, one must head slightly east (although SR 79 is signed as a north–south highway). The southern exit from I-15 is known as Temecula Parkway. SR 79 exits from I-15 in the northern area of Temecula as Winchester Road. It then runs along the eastern city limits of Murrieta before passing by the reservoir at Diamond Valley Lake. SR 79 continues through the community of Winchester and turns east on Florida Avenue west of Hemet. The section between those concurrent with SR 74 and Interstate 15 (in Temecula, Murrieta, Winchester, and Hemet) is signed as Winchester Road.

In Hemet, SR 79 overlaps State Route 74 (Florida Avenue), following it eastward for a few miles before heading north again through San Jacinto. SR 79 goes over a range of hills (Lambs Canyon) and ends in Beaumont at Interstate 10.

SR 79 is part of the California Freeway and Expressway System, and from the northern I-15 junction to I-10 is part of the National Highway System, a network of highways that are considered essential to the country's economy, defense, and mobility by the Federal Highway Administration. It is eligible for the State Scenic Highway System; however, it is not a scenic highway as defined by Caltrans. In 2012, SR 79 had an annual average daily traffic (AADT) of 1,550 between Paso Picacho Campground and Sunrise Highway, and 30,500 at Murrieta Hot Springs Road, the latter of which was the highest AADT for the highway.

History
A stage road went through Oak Grove, and stagecoaches ran from 1858 to 1861 on a route from San Francisco to St. Louis and Memphis. A ranch house, Warner's Ranch, near Warner Springs was a stop on both the San Antonio–San Diego Mail and the Butterfield Overland Mail. A railroad line to Cuyamaca was under construction by 1887, though in 1889 the project encountered problems from workers departing to work in the nearby gold mines. By 1906, the stage road ran from Temecula through Warner Springs into Santa Ysabel and Ramona, and regularly scheduled automobile service was to begin in 1908 between San Diego and Warner Hot Springs.

That year, at a meeting between citizens of Oceanside and Escondido, each city proposed that a road from it to Warner Springs be constructed; the roads would meet somewhere in the San Luis Rey River valley. The president of the Escondido National Bank proposed a route from Escondido to Warner Springs shortly thereafter. Meanwhile, in 1911 The San Diego Union described the future road to Descanso, and described a "branch of the highway" that went through the Valley of the Pines "which for beauty cannot be surpassed in the United States" before continuing to Julian, the beginning of the San Luis Rey River, and Oceanside. However, the next year, the county highway commissioners determined that more funding would be needed to complete the road to Warner Springs.

By November 1912, the road to Warner Springs from San Diego was completed, including the part from Santa Ysabel, which had been widened. The road south of Julian to Decanso was open by 1916, but had a narrow crossing at the Cuyamaca dam, making the trip difficult. In 1922, the Automobile Club of Southern California noted that from Santa Ysabel to Julian, the road was in good repair, as well as from Cuyamaca to Descanso, even though the latter was a dirt road; the Julian to Cuyamaca road had "several soft spots". Seven years later, Julian residents expressed a desire to have the road from there to Descanso paved. Between Descanso and Temecula, what was to become SR 79 was defined as Route 78 in 1933.

In 1947, a contract to grade and pave part of what was known as State Sign Route 79 between Santa Ysabel and Julian was let, as paving of the highway progressed. The next year, plans were presented to realign part of the road between Julian and Cuyamaca, including one proposal to have it cross the lake. The California Chamber of Commerce made the suggestion in 1962 to convert SR 79 from Descanso to Julian to be an expressway. However, in 1968 those plans were called into question when the county planning commission recommended that the freeway be realigned away from Cuyamaca State Park, or not be built at all.

In the 1964 state highway renumbering, the highway was redefined as State Route 79, south of the junction with SR 71; from Temecula to that junction, the route was designated as SR 71 itself. In 1974, the part between the former junction with SR 71 and I-15 was added to SR 79, and removed from SR 71.

Originally, SR 79 was routed on Sage Road between Hemet and Radec.

Following the Cedar Fire in October 2003, utility poles and wires fell down on the highway, and the Cuyamaca area was heavily damaged. The next year, part of SR 79 from the western junction of SR 78 to Engineers Road near Lake Cuyamaca was renamed the Firefighter Steven Rucker Memorial Highway, after the firefighter from Novato who died while volunteering to fight the wildfire in Wynola. The City of Temecula proposed the construction of a four-lane road from State Route 79 that would bypass the city in 2005, though several obstacles to the plan, including aesthetic concerns and objections from the nearby Pechanga tribe, were noted. During the mid-2010s, the part of SR 79 through Winchester was widened to four lanes up to Domenigoni Parkway.

Future
Due to increased traffic congestion through the San Jacinto Valley, there are plans to realign SR 79 to a new four-lane (eventually six-lane) limited-access expressway, spanning approximately 12 miles from East Newport Road to the southern end of the current divided highway portion at Ramona Expressway. The selected alignment would have access points at Domenigoni Parkway, Grand Avenue, SR 74 (Florida Avenue), Esplanade Avenue/Warren Road, Cottonwood Avenue, Sanderson Avenue, and Ramona Expressway, with additional grade separations at Stetson Avenue and Devonshire Avenue. An additional interchange with Mid County Parkway is proposed upon completion of that project. However, construction on the highway realignment has not begun because the project is only partially funded.

Major intersections

See also

References

External links

California @ AARoads.com - State Route 79
Caltrans: Route 79 highway conditions
California Highways: SR 79

079
State Route 079
State Route 079
Murrieta, California
Warner Springs, California